Sakla is a village in Hiiumaa Parish, Hiiu County, on the island of Hiiumaa in Estonia.

References

 

Villages in Hiiu County